Exchange Online Protection (EOP, formerly Forefront Online Protection for Exchange or FOPE) is a hosted e-mail security service, owned by Microsoft, that filters spam and removes computer viruses from e-mail messages. The service does not require client software installation, but is activated by changing each customer's MX record. Each customer pays for the service by means of a subscription.

Most administrative tasks are performed through the use of a web-based administrative console. The console allows customers to perform management tasks, such as adding users and configuring filtering.

EOP is a part of the Exchange Online family of products.

History 
Microsoft Forefront Online Protection for Exchange was originally created by FrontBridge Technologies. Microsoft acquired FrontBridge Technologies Inc. in 2005, and it became a subsidiary of Microsoft.

In 2006, Microsoft announced new branding as Microsoft Exchange Hosted Services (EHS), formerly known as FrontBridge Technologies Inc.

On April 29, 2009, the service was renamed to Forefront Online Security for Exchange.

Forefront Online Security for Exchange (FOSE) version 9.1 was released on June 9, 2009. 

On November 17, 2009, Forefront Online Security for Exchange (FOSE) was rebranded as Forefront Online Protection for Exchange (FOPE). An update to version 9.3 of Forefront Online Protection for Exchange, was also released on this date.

The version 10.1 release of Forefront Online Protection for Exchange (FOPE) was available to customers on January 29, 2010.

On March 31, 2011, Forefront Online Protection for Exchange (FOPE) was updated to version 11.1.

On March 1, 2013, Microsoft launched Exchange Online Protection (EOP). The transition from FOPE to EOP is expected to complete in the first half of 2014.

References

External links 
 

 FOPE User Guide
 Exchange Hosted Archive (EHA) User Guide
 Forefront Online Protection for Exchange (FOPE): FAQ

Anti-spam
Cloud applications
Computer security software
Spam filtering
Windows Server System
2007 software